The diving competitions at the 2018 Commonwealth Games in the Gold Coast, Queensland was held from 10 to 14 April at the 
Gold Coast Aquatic Centre. A total of ten events was contested (five for men and five for women).

Schedule

Medal summary

Medal table

Men

Women

Participating nations
There were 11 participating nations in diving with a total of 69 athletes. The number of athletes a nation entered is in parentheses beside the name of the country.

References

External links
 Results Book – Diving

 
2018
Diving
Commonwealth Games
2018 Commonwealth Games